The Brisbane Limited was an Australian passenger train operated by the New South Wales Government Railways between Sydney and Brisbane from 1888 until February 1990.

History 

The Brisbane Limited originally operated from Sydney via the Main Northern line to Wallangarra. A change of gauge required passengers to change here for a narrow gauge Queensland Railways train on its Southern line to complete the journey to Brisbane.

The Limited service was also known as a 'limited express'; its daily service ran in parallel with a 'mail train', open to passengers, which featured more stops and took several hours longer.

Following the extension of the North Coast line to South Brisbane, in September 1930 it was rerouted shaving six hours off the journey time, even allowing for the need for the train to be taken over the Clarence River by barge pending the completion of the Grafton Bridge. This occurred in May 1932. Its headcode was NL1/NL2.

In the early 1950s, it began to be worked by diesel locomotives and from January 1960 was hauled by 46 class electric locomotives south of Gosford. Also in 1960 stainless steel sleeping carriages were introduced.

From June 1984, it was hauled by electric locomotives to Broadmeadow, and in June 1986 was extended at its northern end over the Merivale Bridge to Roma Street. It was withdrawn in February 1990 to be replaced by an unnamed XPT service.

References

Interstate rail in Australia
Named passenger trains of Australia
Night trains of Australia
Passenger rail transport in New South Wales
Passenger rail transport in Queensland
Railway services introduced in 1888
Railway services discontinued in 1990
1888 establishments in Australia
1990 disestablishments in Australia
Discontinued railway services in Australia